Britannia was a merchant vessel captured from the Dutch. She made one complete whaling voyage to the South Seas. A Spanish vessel captured her at the Galapagos Islands in 1801 on her second whaling voyage.

Britannia was a Dutch prize, captured in 1797 that underwent repairs in 1798. She entered Lloyd's Register in 1798 with W. Shaw, master, W. Boyd, owner, and trade Portsmouth-Jamaica. In 1799 Mortlock replaced Shaw as master, and her trade was listed as Portsmouth-Cape of Good Hope.

Whaling voyage: Captain Mortlake left Britain on 13 March 1799. Britannia called in at Rio de Janeiro in July for sugarcane syrup. She returned to England on 30 May 1800. 

The Spaniards then took their prizes into Lima. Their captor was the privateer Atlante, under the command of Dominque de Orué.

Citations and references
Citations

References
 
 

1790s ships
Whaling ships
Captured ships
Age of Sail merchant ships
Merchant ships of the United Kingdom